Viktoras Vizgirda (January 1, 1904 – July 10, 1993) was a Lithuanian painter. He is mostly known for landscapes and still life, but he also did portraits.

Biography
He was born in Dominikoniai farmstead, Garliava volost, Lithuania, then part of the Russian Empire. His father Jonas Vizgirda was a farmer and surveyor. In 1914, during World War I, after the farm was destroyed and his father died, he and his mother moved to Kaunas.

In 1926, he graduated from the Kaunas Art School and during 1926–1927 he continued his education in Paris, where he became acquainted with the works of French modernists Paul Cézanne, Raoul Dufy, Henri Matisse, André Derain. During 1928–1933 he taught in high schools. During 1934–1940 he taught at the First Kaunas School of Crafts. During 1936–1938 he was chairman of the Union of Lithuanian Artists. During 1941–1943 he was director of the Vilnius Academy of Arts.

In 1944, he emigrated to the West and lived in Vienna, Tübingen, Berlin. From 1946 to 1949 he worked at the School of Arts and Crafts (Werkkunstschule) in Freiburg. In 1947 he took part in the founding of the Institute of Lithuanian Art in Freiburg and became the first chairman of its board.

In 1950 he emigrated to the United States. He died in Cape Cod, Massachusetts.

Works
His paintings were mostly influenced by his teacher,  at the Kaunas Art School, as well as by French post-impressionism.

Since 1930 he had personal exhibitions in the West and in Lithuania, also posthumously.

References

Further reading
 Antanas Andrijauskas, Shining of Expressive Colors and Tinges of Viktoras Vizgirda, Logos (Lithuania), January 2014, pp. 95–104

1904 births
1993 deaths
Lithuanian painters
Academic staff of the Vilnius Academy of Arts
Lithuanian emigrants to the United States